Stara Kamionka may refer to the following places:
Stara Kamionka, Augustów County in Podlaskie Voivodeship (north-east Poland)
Stara Kamionka, Sokółka County in Podlaskie Voivodeship (north-east Poland)
Stara Kamionka, Suwałki County in Podlaskie Voivodeship (north-east Poland)